The 1975–76 New Orleans Jazz season was the team's second in the NBA. They began the season hoping to improve upon their 23–59 output from the previous season. They bested it by fifteen wins, finishing 38–44, but failed to qualify for the playoffs for the second straight season.

Roster

Regular season

Season standings

z – clinched division title
y – clinched division title
x – clinched playoff spot

Record vs. opponents

Awards and records
 Pete Maravich, All-NBA First Team

References

Utah Jazz seasons
New Orleans
New Orl
New Orl